National Route 120 is a national road in Argentina, running NW in Corrientes. The road is marked in red in the map. Previously this road was known as Provincial Route 38 and changed to national jurisdiction in an agreement between Dirección Nacional de Vialidad and the provincial transport authorities, signed by Law # 5152 of Corrientes Province on 3 April 1997

The whole length of the road is within Corrientes Province, crossing through Santo Tomé Department and Ituzaingó Department.

Old road
In previous times there was a road with this number on the West of Corrientes Province. Today this older road is part of National Route 12. This section is marked in green on the map.

References

National roads in Corrientes Province
Tourism in Argentina